Jostein Helge Bernhardsen (born 18 June 1945) is a Norwegian diplomat.

He started working for the Norwegian Ministry of Foreign Affairs in 1973 and was head of department in the ministry from 1995 to 2001. He was the Norwegian ambassador to Ukraine from 2001 to 2006 and to Belgium from 2006 to 2011.

Bernhardsen was named a Knight 1st class of the Royal Norwegian Order of Merit in 2002.

References

1945 births
Living people
Norwegian civil servants
Ambassadors of Norway to Ukraine
Ambassadors of Norway to Belgium